Alakola Ella also referred to as Thaliya Wetuna Ella ( is a waterfall which is located in Alakola estate in the Knuckles mountain range, Matale of Central Province. The waterfall was named after a tea planter called Allen Collen who was active during the colonial era.

See also 

 List of waterfalls of Sri Lanka

References 

Waterfalls of Sri Lanka
Landforms of Matale District